Singaar is a 1949 Indian Hindi-language romantic film directed by J. K. Nanda. Produced by R. B. Haldia under his production  company, the film stars Suraiya, Madhubala and Jairaj, with Durga Khote and K. N. Singh appearing in supporting roles. The music of the film was composed by Khurshid Anwar.

Also written by Nanda, Singaar featured Suraiya and Jairaj as a couple whose marriage begins troubling after he falls in love with a prostitute named Sitara, played by Madhubala. Principal photography of Singaar took place in Shree Sound studio in Bombay, and was marked by professional rivalry between Suraiya and Madhubala. After many delays, the film was theatrically released on December 12, 1949, and became a critical and commercial success. Madhubala's work specially gained widespread praise. The following year Anwar won an award for composing the music of the film.

Plot 
The film tells the story of a doctor who carries an extramarital affair with a dancing girl.

Cast 
The cast of Singaar included:
 Suraiya as Shanta
Madhubala as Sitara
 Jairaj as Dr. Kishan
 Amir Banu as Sitara's mother
 Durga Khote as Kishan's mother
 Madan Puri as Dr. Niranjan
 K. N. Singh as Kishan's father
 Shivraj as Ramu
 Randhir as Ramesh
 Cuckoo as Dancer
 Prem Dhawan as Dancer

Production 
The principal photography of Singaar took place in Shree Sound studios between February and May 1949. The film's was a troubled production, marked by professional rivalry between Madhubala and Suraiya. Reportedly, the latter was unhappy with Madhubala's rising fame and felt that the diligent actress did not deserve the attention director Nanda was paying to her. Mohan Deep, Madhubala's biographer, has stated the following in his book The Mystery And Mystique of Madhubala (1996):

Soundtrack 
The soundtrack was composed by Khursheed Anwar, and lyrics were penned by Deenanath Madhok, Nakshab and Shakeel Badayuni.

Release 
Singaar, despite being completed in May, was distributed in July. It was ultimately released on December 12, 1949.

Reception 
The film was a box office success and became the seventeenth highest-grossing film of the year. It received excellent reviews from critics, but while its production values and soundtrack were lauded, some criticism was directed towards the slow-paced direction. The Motion Picture Magazine nevertheless called it one of the best films made in 1949, describing it as a "fabulous picture well acted".

Madhubala's portrayal of a prostitute was critically acclaimed, and critics rated her superior to the leading actress Suraiya. Film critic Baburao Patel stated: "Madhubala beats Suraiya hollow in every sequence they meet. She stores more emotions in a single face than would a thousand girls with as many faces." Singaar is said to be a watershed film, which started the downfall of Suraiya, the leading star of the time, and simultaneous rise of Madhubala, who later became the top actress in the 1950s and early 1960s.

Awards 
Music director Anwar won the "Clare Award for Best Music Director." He was praised for giving "folk touch to several numbers."

References

Sources

External links 

1949 films
1940s Hindi-language films
Indian musical drama films
1940s musical drama films
Indian black-and-white films
1949 drama films